The 2015 Bitburger Open Grand Prix Gold was the fortieth grand prix gold and grand prix tournament of the 2015 BWF Grand Prix and Grand Prix Gold. The tournament was held in Saarlandhalle, Saarbrücken, Germany October 27 until November 1, 2015 and had a total purse of $120,000.

Men's singles

Seeds

  Chou Tien-chen (quarterfinals)
  Tommy Sugiarto (third round)
  Marc Zwiebler (semifinals)
  Hans-Kristian Vittinghus (quarterfinals)
  Rajiv Ouseph (semifinals)
  Tanongsak Saensomboonsuk (third round)
  Sho Sasaki (second round)
  Hsu Jen-hao (quarterfinals)
  Dionysius Hayom Rumbaka (third round)
  Takuma Ueda (second round)
  Boonsak Ponsana (second round)
  Wong Wing Ki (final)
  Ng Ka Long (champion)
  Chong Wei Feng (third round)
  Scott Evans (third round)
  B. Sai Praneeth (third round)

Finals

Top half

Section 1

Section 2

Section 3

Section 4

Bottom half

Section 5

Section 6

Section 7

Section 8

Women's singles

Seeds

  Carolina Marin (withdrew)
  Ratchanok Intanon (semifinals)
  Nozomi Okuhara (quarterfinals)
  Akane Yamaguchi (champion)
  Sayaka Takahashi (withdrew)
  Michelle Li (withdrew)
  Busanan Ongbumrungpan (final)
  Porntip Buranaprasertsuk (second round)

Finals

Top half

Section 1

Section 2

Bottom half

Section 3

Section 4

Men's doubles

Seeds

  Mads Conrad-Petersen / Mads Pieler Kolding (champion)
  Vladimir Ivanov / Ivan Sozonov (final)
  Goh V Shem / Tan Wee Kiong (quarterfinals)
  Hirokatsu Hashimoto / Noriyasu Hirata (semifinals)
  Kim Astrup / Anders Skaarup Rasmussen (second round)
  Takeshi Kamura / Keigo Sonoda (semifinals)
  Manu Attri / B. Sumeeth Reddy (withdrew)
  Marcus Ellis / Chris Langridge (first round)

Finals

Top half

Section 1

Section 2

Bottom half

Section 3

Section 4

Women's doubles

Seeds

  Eefje Muskens / Selena Piek (withdrew)
  Jwala Gutta / Ashwini Ponnappa (second round)
  Naoko Fukuman / Kurumi Yonao (second round)
  Vivian Hoo Kah Mun / Woon Khe Wei (semifinals)

Finals

Top half

Section 1

Section 2

Bottom half

Section 3

Section 4

Mixed doubles

Seeds

  Chris Adcock / Gabrielle Adcock (final)
  Praveen Jordan / Debby Susanto (quarterfinals)
  Edi Subaktiar / Gloria Emanuelle Widjaja (first round)
  Michael Fuchs / Birgit Michels (quarterfinals)

Finals

Top half

Section 1

Section 2

Bottom half

Section 3

Section 4

References

SaarLorLux Open
BWF Grand Prix Gold and Grand Prix
Bitburger Open Grand Prix Gold